My Scary Girl (lit. "Sweet, Bloodthirsty Lover") is a 2006 South Korean black/romantic comedy film written and directed by Son Jae-gon.

With a relatively low budget and lead actors who were not particularly famous at the time, My Scary Girl became a sleeper hit and the tenth top-selling domestic film of the year with 2,286,745 tickets sold.

Plot 
29-year-old Hwang Dae-woo (Park Yong-woo) is a successful university lecturer of English, yet due to his awkward and shy nature around women, has yet to engage in any romantic relationship.  When art major student Lee Mi-na (Choi Kang-hee) suddenly moves into his apartment complex, Dae-woo asks her out, and finds himself in an almost-too-good-to-be-true relationship. Yet, Mi-na seems to be hiding something sinister, and Dae-woo encounters a rather interesting twist to his fairy-tale-like first love.

Cast 
Park Yong-woo as Hwang Dae-woo
Choi Kang-hee as Lee Mi-na
Jo Eun-ji as Baek Jang-mi
Jeong Kyeong-ho as Kye-dong
Jo Young-gyu as Sung-shik
Lee Hee-do as Attorney Min
Sunwoo Sun as Jung-hwa
Jeon Se-hong as female employee's friend
Kwak Min-seok as psychiatrist
Kim Ki-cheon as truck driver
Jo Seok-hyeon as neighborhood scamp
Oh Yoo-jin as secretary

Awards and nominations 
2006 Busan Film Critics Awards
Best Screenplay: Son Jae-gon

2006 Blue Dragon Film Awards
Nomination - Best Actress: Choi Kang-hee
Nomination - Best Screenplay: Son Jae-gon
Nomination - Best New Director: Son Jae-gon

2006 Korean Film Awards
Best Screenplay: Son Jae-gon

2006 Director's Cut Awards
Best New Director: Son Jae-gon

2007 Asian Film Awards
Nomination - Best Screenwriter: Son Jae-gon

2007 Baeksang Arts Awards
Nomination - Best Screenplay: Son Jae-gon
Nomination - Best New Director: Son Jae-gon

Musical theatre adaptation 
A musical based on My Scary Girl was selected for the second Daegu International Music Festival. Its book and lyrics were written by Kang Kyoung-ae, and music composed by Will Aronson. The show received funding for further development and was performed publicly at the Daegu Bongsan Culture Center from July 5–6, 2008. A full production ran in Seoul in 2009, starring Shin Sung-rok. The show was designated Best Original Musical in the small theater category at the 2009 Korea Musical Awards.

An American version of the musical was selected by the Barrington Stage Company for the 2008 Musical Theater Lab. This workshop production was performed from July 10–26, 2008. This version had a book written by Kang Kyoung-ae and Mark St. Germain, music composed by Will Aronson, lyrics written by Kang Kyoung-ae, and additional lyrics contributed by William Finn.

As part of an international exchange program with the Daegu International Musical Festival, the New York Musical Theatre Festival presented the Korean version of My Scary Girl on October 1–4, 2009 at the Acorn Theater in New York City. My Scary Girl was selected as the Outstanding New Musical in the festival. In addition, Bang Jin-ui won an award for Outstanding Individual Performance, and Honorable Mention citations were earned by Will Aronson for Excellence in Writing: Music, Kang Kyoung-ae for Excellence in Writing: Book, Byun Jung-joo for Excellence in Direction, and the cast for Outstanding Ensemble Performance.

References

External links 
 
 
 
 
 My Scary Girl at Fantasia Festival
 My Scary Girl at the New York Korean Film Festival

2006 romantic comedy films
2006 films
South Korean black comedy films
South Korean crime comedy films
2000s Korean-language films
2000s South Korean films